The Greenville Majors minor league baseball team played in the East Texas League (1946), Big State League (1947–1950, 1953) and Sooner State League (1957). It was based in the American city of Greenville, Texas. The club was affiliated with the New York Yankees, whom they defeated in a 1949 home game at Majors Stadium. Both the stadium and team were named after Lt. Truett Jay Majors, the first youth from Greenville to be killed in WW2.

Major league alumni

Jimmy Adair
Red Borom
Gibby Brack
Harry Davis
John Davis
Red Durrett
Bubba Floyd
Len Gilmore
Sal Gliatto
Buddy Hancken
Bill Henry
Alex Hooks
Joe Koppe
George Milstead
Marshall Renfroe
Lefty Scott
Dick Stone
Monty Stratton
Jay Ward
Jim Willis
Bud Zipfel

References

Baseball teams established in 1946
Defunct minor league baseball teams
Baseball teams disestablished in 1957
1946 establishments in Texas
1957 disestablishments in Texas
Defunct Big State League teams
Defunct baseball teams in Texas
East Texas League teams